The 2015 Ken Galluccio Cup was the seventh edition of the Ken Galluccio Cup, the European men's lacrosse club competition.

Stockport retained the title, achieving their third one ever.

Competition format
The twelve teams were divided into four groups of three, where the two first qualified teams joined the quarterfinals.

Group stage

Group A

Group B

Group C

Group D

Championship bracket

Fifth-position bracket

Ninth-position group

References

External links
Official website
Competition at Pointbench.com

Ken Galluccio Cup
2015 in lacrosse
Ken Galluccio Cup